Erwin Mario Saavedra Flores (born 22 February 1996) is a Bolivian  footballer who plays for Mamelodi Sundowns in the DSTV Premiership and the Bolivia national team. Mainly a right midfielder, he can also play as a right-back.

Club career statistics

International career
Saavedra was summoned to the Bolivian U-20 team to play in the 2015 South American Youth Football Championship.

International goals
Scores and results list Bolivia's goal tally first.

References

External links
 
 
 
 

1996 births
Living people
People from Oruro, Bolivia
Bolivian footballers
Association football defenders
Association football midfielders
Club Bolívar players
Goiás Esporte Clube players
Bolivian Primera División players
Campeonato Brasileiro Série B players
Bolivia under-20 international footballers
Bolivia international footballers
Copa América Centenario players
2019 Copa América players
2021 Copa América players